Tiutiunnyk is a Ukrainian-language surname. It is an occupational surname derived from the occupation related to growing/manufacturing/selling tobacco (tiutiun, тютюн in Ukrainian).

The surname may refer to:
Hryhir Tiutiunnyk (1931-1980), Ukrainian writer
Hryhoriy Tiutiunnyk (1920-1961), Ukrainian writer
Yurii Tiutiunnyk (1891-1930), Ukrainian military commander

Ukrainian-language surnames